Sheikh Nasser Sabah Al-Ahmad Al-Sabah (27 April 1948 – 20 December 2020) was the First Deputy Prime Minister, Minister of Defense of Kuwait, and before that he was the head of the Amiri Diwan in 2006–2017. Nasser was the eldest son of the hereditary ruler or Emir of Kuwait, Sabah Al-Ahmad Al-Jaber Al-Sabah (1929–2020). Prior to his death in December 2020, Nasser was identified as a leading candidate to become the Crown Prince of Kuwait, or the heir apparent. He was a key figure in Kuwait's Vision 2035 plan, which included a planned city in northern Kuwait dubbed "Silk City".

Career 
After his father was became ruler in 2006, Nasser was appointed Head of the Ruler's Court, or Minister of the Amiri Diwan of Kuwait. In 2017, he was appointed Deputy Prime Minister and Minister of Defense.

Patron of Arts and Culture
Sheikh Nasser established Dar al Athar al Islamiyyah, a Kuwaiti cultural foundation based around the Al-Sabah Antiques Group. Sheikh Nasser Sabah was an honorary member of the Board of Trustees of the Metropolitan Museum of Art in New York City.

Membership of Committees and Associations 
 Head of the Committee for Common Development Enterprises between the State of Kuwait and the Islamic Republic of Iran - concerned with economic and political issues in the region, the organization's members also include many eminent Kuwaiti economists and political theorists
 Founder and member of Kuwait Red Crescent Society
 Founder and member of the Kuwaiti Association for the Protection of Public Funds
 Founder and member of Kuwait Equestrian Club
 Honorary President of the Kuwaiti Association of Formative Arts

Death
Nasser's death was announced on 20 December 2020. After battling lung related problems since 2018. Sheikh Nasser was 72.

References

1948 births
2020 deaths
Children of national leaders
Defence ministers of Kuwait
House of Al-Sabah
Sons of monarchs